WWWH-FM (92.7 FM, "Paradise 92.7") is a radio station licensed to serve the community of Haleyville, Alabama, United States.  The station, established in 1979 as "WJBB-FM", is owned by AMS Radio, LLC.

Programming
On January 1, 2012 WWWH-FM switched to a hot adult contemporary music format branded as "Paradise 92.7".

History
The Haleyville Broadcasting Company, Inc., received a construction permit from the U.S. Federal Communications Commission (FCC) to build a sister station for WJBB (1230 AM) and, after months of testing and construction, WJBB-FM began broadcast operations on July 14, 1979. The station received its broadcast license from the FCC on October 31, 1979.

Launched in 1979 with a middle of the road music format, WJBB-FM switched to a full service country music in the mid-1980s. It maintained this country format, branded as "B93", with live and local disc jockeys, local news, local farm reports, and community announcements (and some programming from Westwood One) until the new ownership switched to classic hits on January 1, 2012.

From its launch in July 1979 though November 2011, the station was owned by the Slatton family. John Slatton was the president of the Haleyville Broadcasting Company, Inc., and general manager of WJBB-FM and its sister station WJBB (1230 AM) until his death in 2008. In 1986, Slatton was named ABA Broadcaster of the Year by the Alabama Broadcasters Association for his work with WJBB-AM/FM. Slatton's son, Terry Slatton, managed the station in later years.

In October 2011, The Haleyville Broadcasting Company, Inc., reached an agreement to transfer the broadcast licenses for WJBB and WJBB-FM to AMS Radio, LLC, for a combined price of $90,000. The new company is owned by Timothy and Emily A. Smyder of Marietta, Georgia. The FCC approved the deal on November 29, 2011, and the transaction was completed the next day. The new owners had the stations' call signs changed to WWWH and WWWH-FM, respectively, on December 7, 2011.

References

External links
Paradise 92.7 official Facebook page

WWWH-FM
Hot adult contemporary radio stations in the United States
Radio stations established in 1979
Winston County, Alabama
1979 establishments in Alabama